Arc may refer to:

Mathematics
 Arc (geometry), a segment of a differentiable curve
 Circular arc, a segment of a circle
 Arc (topology), a segment of a path
 Arc length, the distance between two points along a section of a curve
 Arc (projective geometry), a particular type of set of points of a projective plane
 arc (function prefix) (arcus), a prefix for inverse trigonometric functions
 Directed arc, a directed edge in graph theory
 Minute and second of arc, a unit of angular measurement equal to 1/60 of one degree.
Wild arc, a concept from geometric topology

Science and technology

Geology
 Arc, in geology a mountain chain configured as an arc due to a common orogeny along a plate margin or the effect of back-arc extension
 Hellenic arc, the arc of islands positioned over the Hellenic Trench in the Aegean Sea off Greece

 Back-arc basin, a subsided region caused by back-arc extension

 Back-arc region, the region created by back-arc extension, containing all the basins, faults, and volcanoes generated by the extension
 Island arc, an arc-shaped archipelago, usually so configured for geologic causes, such as sea-floor spreading, common orogeny on the margin of the same plate, or back-arc extension
 Northeastern Japan Arc, an island arc
 Banda Arc, a set of island arcs in Indonesia
 Continental arc, in geology a continental mountain chain or parallel alignment of chains (as opposed to island arcs), configured in an arc
 Eastern Arc Mountains, a continental arc of Africa
 Volcanic arc, a chain of volcanoes positioned in an arc shape as seen from above
 Aleutian Arc, a large volcanic arc in the U.S. state of Alaska
 Nastapoka arc, a circular coastline in Hudson Bay

Technology
 arc, the command-line interface for ArcInfo
 ARC (file format), a file name extension for archive files
 ARC (processor), 32-bit RISC architecture
 ARC (adaptive replacement cache), a page replacement algorithm for high-performance filesystems
 Arc (programming language), a Lisp dialect designed by Paul Graham
 Arc (Internet browser), an Internet browser currently developed by Darin Fisher of The Browser Company
 Sony Ericsson Xperia Arc, a cellphone
 Audio Return Channel, an audio technology working over HDMI
 Authenticated Received Chain, an email authentication system
 Arc lamp, a lamp that produces light by an electric arc 
 Xenon arc lamp, a highly specialized type of gas discharge lamp
 Deuterium arc lamp, a low-pressure gas-discharge light source
 Hydrargyrum medium-arc iodide lamp, the trademark name of Osram's brand of metal-halide gas discharge medium arc-length lamp
 Electric arc furnace, a furnace that heats charged material by means of an electric arc
 Arc welding, a welding process that is used to join metal to metal
 Arc-fault circuit interrupter, a specialized circuit breaker
 Arc converter, a spark transmitter
 Intel Arc, brand of graphics processing units designed by Intel

Other science
 Electric arc, an ongoing plasma discharge (an electric current through a gas), producing light and heat
 Arc flash, the light and heat produced as part of an arc fault
 Arc (protein), a name of product of an immediate early gene, also called Arg3.1
 Reflex arc, a neural pathway that controls a reflex
 Circumhorizontal arc, an optical phenomenon
 Circumzenithal arc, an optical phenomenon

Arts and entertainment

Music
 The Arcs, an American garage rock band formed by Dan Auerbach in 2015

 A.R.C. (album), by pianist Chick Corea with bassist David Holland and drummer Barry Altschul recorded in 1971
 Arc (Neil Young & Crazy Horse album), 1991
 Arc (Everything Everything album), 2013
 Arc (EP), a 2016 EP by Agoraphobic Nosebleed
  "Arc", a song by Pearl Jam from Riot Act

Video games
 Arc System Works, a video game developer
 Luminous Arc, a video game series
 The title character of Arc the Lad, a series of role-playing video games for the PlayStation and PlayStation 2
 Armored Response Coalition, a fictional military/resistance organization seen in the 2020 video game “DOOM Eternal”

Other arts and entertainment
 Tilted Arc, a controversial public art installation by Richard Serra
 Arc Poetry Magazine, a Canadian literary journal
 Character arc, the status of a character as it unfolds throughout the story
 Story arc, an extended or continuing storyline
 Arcs, one of the twelve basic principles of animation

Codes
 Arcata Transit Center, Amtrak code for the station in Arcata, California
 IATA airport code of Arctic Village Airport, a public use airport in Alaska
 ISO 639-2 and -5 language code of the Aramaic language, a Semitic language
 ISO 639-3 language code of the Official Aramaic language, spoken between 700 BCE and 300 BCE

Companies and organizations
 Arc International, a French manufacturer and distributor of household goods
 Arc Publications, a UK independent publisher of poetry
 Arc @ UNSW, the principal student organisation at the University of New South Wales
 Arc of the United States, a charitable organization serving people with intellectual and developmental disabilities
 Arc Holdings, a French manufacturer of household goods

Places
 Arc (Provence), a river of southern France, flowing into the Étang de Berre
 Arc (Savoie), a river of eastern France, tributary of the Isère river
 Les Arcs, a ski resort in the French Alps
 Arc, short for "Arcade"; a Street suffix as used in the US

Other uses 
 Arc (Bahá'í), a number of administrative buildings for the Bahá'í Faith, located on Mount Carmel in Israel
 Arc (greyhounds), a major greyhound race in the Greyhound Board of Great Britain calendar

See also
 Joan of Arc (c. 1412–1431), national heroine of France and Catholic saint
 ARC (disambiguation)
 Arc Angel (disambiguation)
 Arc reactor (disambiguation)
 Arch (disambiguation)
 Arch of Triumph (disambiguation)
 Ark (disambiguation)